The Castle Square Theatre (1894–1932) in Boston, Massachusetts, was located on Tremont Street in the South End. The building existed until its demolition in 1933.

Actors who worked in stock theater there included Edmund Breese.

Notable people
Gertrude Quinlan

References

Further reading
 A year of opera at the Castle Square Theatre from May 6, '95 to May 6, '96: containing portraits and sketches of the principal singers and a record of the casts of characters of the various operas produced together with a short story of each. Boston: Charles Elwell French, 1896 
 William Harvey Birkmire. "The Castle Square Theatre." The planning and construction of American theatres. NY: J. Wiley & sons, 1896
 Six years of drama at the Castle Square Theatre: with portraits of the members of the company and complete programs of all plays produced, May 3, 1897 – May 3, 1903. Boston, C.E. French, 1903

External links

 Emerson College. Sigmund A. Lavine Boston Theatre Collection. Includes items related to Castle Sq. Theatre.
 Castle Square Theatre souvenir portrait photographs: Guide Harvard Theatre Collection, Houghton Library
 Castle Square Theatre (421 Tremont Street, Boston) The Life & Times of Joseph Haworth

1894 establishments in Massachusetts
1932 disestablishments in Massachusetts
Cultural history of Boston
20th century in Boston
Former theatres in Boston
South End, Boston